Lutibacter oceani is a Gram-negative, facultatively anaerobic, short-rod-shaped, non-spore-forming and non-motile bacterium from the genus of Lutibacter which has been isolated from marine sediments from Korea.

References

External links
microbewiki

Flavobacteria
Bacteria described in 2017